A Song a Day (originally as Grampy in "A Song a Day") is a 1936 Fleischer Studios animated short film starring Betty Boop and featuring Grampy.

Synopsis
At Betty Boop's Animal Hospital, various animals have appropriate ailments - a giraffe has a pain in the neck, a herring is pickled, etc. Morale becomes a problem until Professor Grampy comes to the rescue with a song and dance to cure the blues.

References

External links
A Song a Day on YouTube
A Song a Day at The Big Cartoon Database.
A Song a Day at IMDb.

1936 films
1936 short films
Betty Boop cartoons
1930s American animated films
American black-and-white films
1936 animated films
Paramount Pictures short films
Fleischer Studios short films
Short films directed by Dave Fleischer